Marvin is a male given name, derived from the Welsh name Mervyn, an Anglicized form of Merfyn. The name Merfyn contains the Old Welsh elements mer, probably meaning "marrow", and myn, meaning "eminent".

People

A
Marvin Abney (born 1949), American politician
Marvin Adams, American nuclear engineer
Marvin Lee Aday (1948–2022), American singer
Marvin Agustin (born 1979), Filipino actor
Marvin Albert (1924–1996), American writer
Marvin C. Alkin (born 1934), American professor
Marvin Allen (disambiguation), multiple people
Marvin Ammori, American activist
Marvin Anderson (born 1982), Jamaican athlete
Marvin Harold Anderson (1918–1998), American businessman
Marvin Andrews (born 1975), Trinidadian footballer
Marvin Anieboh (born 1997), Equatorial Guinean footballer
Marvin Stuart Antelman (1933–2013), Israeli-American chemist
Marvin Arneson (born 1943), Canadian boxer
Marvin S. Arrington Sr. (born 1941), American judge
Marvin Ash (1914–1974), American pianist
Marvin J. Ashton (1915–1994), American author and religious figure
Marvin Aspen (born 1934), American judge
Marvan Atapattu (born 1970), Sri Lankan cricket coach
Marvin Austin (born 1989), American football player
Marvin Ávila (born 1985), Guatemalan footballer

B
Marvin Bagley III (born 1999), American basketball player
Marvin Bakalorz (born 1989), German footballer
Marvin Bam (born 1977), South African field hockey player
Marvin Barker (1912–??), American baseball player
Marvin Barkis (born 1943), American politician
Marvin Barnes (1952–2014), American basketball player
Marvin Bartley (born 1986), English footballer
Marvin Bass (1919–2010), American football player
Marvin R. Baxter (born 1940), American judge
Marvin Bejarano (born 1988), Bolivian footballer
Marvin Bell (1937–2020), American poet
Marvin Benard (born 1970), American baseball player
Marvin Bernárdez (born 1995), Honduran footballer
Marvin Blapoh (born 1998), Liberian footballer
Marvin A. Blyden (born 1962), Virgin Island politician
Marvin Booker (born 1990), American football player
Marvin Bower (1903–2003), American businessman
Marvin Bracy (born 1993), American football player
Marvin Brown (born 1983), English footballer
Marvin Brown (Honduran footballer) (born 1974), Honduran footballer
Marvin Burke (1918–1994), American race car driver
Marvin W. Bursch (1913–2000), American businessman and politician
Marvin Burton (1885–1970), American law enforcement officer
Marvin Bush (born 1956), American businessman

C
Marvin Cabrera (born 1980), Mexican footballer
Marvin Camel (born 1951), American boxer
Marvin Felix Camillo (1937–1988), American theatre director
Marvin Campbell (born 1961), British gymnast
Marvin Campbell (politician) (1849–1930), American politician
Marvin Casey (born 1981), Israeli-American dancer
Marvin Ceballos (born 1992), Guatemalan footballer
Marvin Chávez (born 1983), Honduran footballer
Marvin Chirelstein (1928–2015), American professor
Marvin Chodorow (1913–2005), American physicist
Marvin J. Chomsky (1929–2022), American director
Marvin Cobb (born 1953), American football player
Marvin Cohen (American writer) (born 1931), American novelist
Marvin L. Cohen (born 1935), American physicist
Marvin Coleman (born 1972), American football player
Marvin Cone (1891–1965), American painter
Marvin Rodríguez Cordero (born 1960), Costa Rican politician
Marvin R. Couch, American politician
Marvin Crawford (1932–2004), American skier
Marvin Creamer (1916–2020), American sailor and professor
Marvin Crenshaw (born 1952), America football player
Marvin Cruz (born 1985), Filipino basketball player
Marvin T. Culpepper (1908–1970), American politician
Marvin Çuni (born 2001), Albanian footballer
Marvin Cupper (born 1994), German ice hockey player

D
Marvin Dana (1867–1926), American author
Marvin Dauner (1927–2010), American farmer and politician
Marvin Davis (1925–2004), American industrialist
Marvin Davis (Canadian football) (born 1952), American football player
Marvin R. Dee (1917–1977), American lawyer and politician
Marvin Degon (born 1983), American ice hockey player
Marvin Dekil, Nigerian environmental scientist
Marvin De Lima (born 2004), French footballer
Marvin Delph (born 1956), American basketball player
Marvin Dienst (born 1997), German racing driver
Marvin Dixon (born 1983), Jamaican bobsledder

E
Marvin Eastman (born 1971), American mixed martial artist
Marvin Egho (born 1994), Austrian footballer
Marvin Ekpiteta (born 1995), English footballer
Marvin Emnes (born 1988), Dutch footballer
Marvin Esser (born 1994), German footballer
Marvin Etzioni, American singer

F
Marvin Filipo (born 1987), New Zealand rugby league footballer
Marvin Fletes (born 1997), Nicaraguan footballer
Marvin Francis (1955–2005), Native Canadian poet
Marvin Franklin, American football coach
Marvin Freeman (born 1963), American baseball player
Marvin Friedrich (born 1995), German footballer

G
Marvin Gabrion (born 1953), American murderer
Marvin Gakpa (born 1993), French footballer
Marvin Gamez (born 2003), American soccer player
Marvin K. Gardner (born 1952), American hymn writer
Marvin Gauci, Maltese chef
Marvin Gay Sr. (1914–1998), American minister
Marvin Gaye (1939–1984), American singer-songwriter
Marvin Gettleman (1933–2017), American professor
Marvin Girouard (1939–2020), American business executive
Marvin Goldfried (born 1936), American psychologist
Marvin Goldman (born 1928), American biologist
Marvin Goldstein (born 1950), Israeli-American pianist
Marvin Goodfriend (1950–2019), American economist
Marvin Graves (born 1971), American football player
Marvin Gray (1954–2013), American serial killer
Marvin Greenberg (1935–2017), American mathematician
Marvin Griffin (1907–1982), American politician

H
Marvin Hagler (1954–2021), American boxer
Marvin Hall (born 1993), American football player
Marvin Hamlisch (1944–2012), American composer
Marvin Hammond (1926–2003), Canadian rower
Marvin Harada (born 1953), Canadian-American bishop
Marvin Harris (1927–2001), American anthropologist
Marvin Harrison (born 1972), American football player
Marvin Harrison Jr. (born 2002), American football player
Marvin Harvey (disambiguation), multiple people
Marvin Hayes (disambiguation), multiple people
Marvin Heemeyer (1951–2004), American welder, businessman and vandal
Marvin C. Helling (1923–2014), American football player
Marvin Hershkowitz (1931–2020), American basketball player
Marvin Hewitt (born 1922), American imposter
Marvin Hier (born 1939), American film producer
Marvin S. Hill (1928–2016), American professor
Marvin Hinton (born 1940), English footballer
Marvin Hoffenberg (1914–2013), American economist and political scientist
Marvin E. Holmes Jr. (born 1948), American politician
Marvin Hudson (born 1964), American baseball umpire
Marvin Hughitt (1837–1928), American businessman
Marvin Humes (born 1985), English singer
Marvin Hunt (born 1951), Canadian politician

I
Marvin P. Iannone, American police officer
Marvin Iraheta (born 1992), Salvadoran footballer
Marvin Irvin (born 1949), American serial killer
Marvin Isley (1953–2010), American guitarist
Marvin Israel (1924–1984), American artist

J
Marvin James (born 1989), Swiss snowboarder
Marvin Johnson (disambiguation), multiple people
Marvin Jones (disambiguation), multiple people
Marvin Josephson (1927–2022), American executive
Marvin Jouno (born 1984), French musician

K
Marvin Kalb (born 1930), American journalist
Marvin Kaplan (1927–2016), American actor
Marvin Kaplan (lawyer), American lawyer and politician
Marvin Karlins (born 1941), American professor
Marvin Kaye (born 1938), American author
Marvin Kent (1816–1908), American politician
Marvin Kimble (born 1995), American artistic gymnast
Marvin Kirchhöfer (born 1994), German racing driver
Marvin Kitman (born 1939), American critic
Marvin Kleihs (born 1994), German footballer
Marvin Knoll (born 1990), German footballer
Marvin Kokos (born 2000), French footballer
Marvin Koner (1921–1983), American photographer
Marvin Kratter (1915–1999), American real estate developer
Marvin Kren (born 1980), Austrian director
Marvin Krislov (born 1960), American academic administrator
Marvin Kristynik, American football player
Marvin Krohn (born 1947), American criminologist

L
Marvin Lamb (born 1946), American composer
Marvin Lane (born 1950), American baseball player
Marvin Lazarus (born 1985), South African cricketer
Marvin Levy (disambiguation), multiple people
Marvin Lewellyn (1919–2010), American football coach
Marvin Lewis (born 1958), American football coach
Marvin Lier (born 1992), Swiss handball player
Marvin Lim (born 1984), Filipino-American politician
Marvin Lipofsky (1938–2016), American artist
Marvin Loback (1896–1938), American actor
Marvin Loría (born 1997), Costa Rican footballer

M
Marvin Makinen (born 1939), American professor
Marvin Mandel (1920–2015), American politician
Marvin L. Maple (1936–2016), American criminal
Marvin Mariche (born 2004), American soccer player
Marvin Márquez (born 1998), Salvadoran footballer
Marvin Martin (born 1988), French footballer
Marvin Martinez, Salvadoran-American academic administrator
Marvin Matip (born 1985), German footballer
Marvin H. McIntyre (1878–1943), American journalist
Marvin McNutt (born 1989), American football player
Marvin McQuitty (1966–2012), American drummer
Marvin Mehlem (born 1997), German footballer
Marvin Melville (born 1935), American skier
Marvin Menzies (born 1961), American basketball coach
Marvin Merritt IV (born 1998), American actor
Marvin Meyer (1948–2012), American scholar
Marvin Milkes (1923–1982), American sports executive
Marvin Miller (disambiguation), multiple people
Marvin Mims (born 2002), American football player
Marvin Minoff (1931–2009), American producer
Marvin Minsky (1927–2016), American cognitive scientist
Marvin Mirisch (1918–2002), American producer
Marvin Mitchell (born 1984), American football player
Marvin Mitchelson (1928–2004), American lawyer
Marvin Möller (born 1999), German tennis player
Marvin Monterrosa (born 1991), Salvadoran footballer
Marvin Calvo Montoya (born 1961), Costa Rican biologist and politician
Marvin Moore (born 1938), Canadian politician
Marvin Morgan (born 1983), English footballer
Marvin Morgan Jr. (born 1992), Jamaican footballer
Marvin Mudrick (1921–1986), American professor
Marvin Musquin (born 1989), French motocross racer

N
Marvin Nash (born 1953), Canadian sprinter
Marvin Nelson (born 1958), American politician
Marvin E. Newman (born 1927), American photographer

O
Marvin Obando (born 1960), Costa Rican footballer
Marvin Obuz (born 2002), German footballer
Marvin O'Connor (born 1991), French rugby union footballer
Marvin O'Connor (basketball) (born 1978), American basketball player
Marvin Ogunjimi (born 1987), Belgian-Nigerian footballer
Marvin Ogunsipe (born 1996), Austrian basketball player
Marvin Olasky (born 1950), American magazine editor
Marvin Oliver (disambiguation), multiple people
Marvin Omondi (born 1996), Kenyan footballer
Marvin Opler (1914–1981), American anthropologist
Marvin Orie (born 1993), South African rugby union footballer
Marvin Owusu (born 2003), Ghanaian footballer

P
Marvin Panch (1926–2015), American stock car racing driver
Marvin Park (born 2000), Spanish footballer
Marvin Peersman (born 1991), Belgian footballer
Marvin R. Pendarvis (born 1989), American politician
Marvin Perkins, American music producer
Marvin Perrett (1925–2007), American sailor
Marvin Banks Perry Jr. (1918–1994), American academic administrator
Marvin Philip (born 1982), American football player
Marvin Phillips (born 1983), American basketball player
Marvin Pierce (1893–1969), American publisher
Marvin Pieringer (born 1999), German footballer
Marvin Piñón (born 1991), Mexican footballer
Marvin Pipkin (1889–1977), American chemist
Marvin Plattenhardt (born 1992), German footballer
Marvin Ponce, Honduran politician
Marvin Pope (born 1969), American football player
Marvin Potzmann (born 1993), Austrian footballer
Marvin Pourié (born 1991), German footballer
Marvin Powell (born 1955), American football player
Marvin Priest (born 1981), British-Australian singer-songwriter

Q
Marvin Quijano (born 1979), Salvadoran footballer

R
Marvin Raeburn (born 1975), Trinidadian footballer
Marvin Rainwater (1925–2013), American singer-songwriter
Marvin Ramirez (born 1989), Colombian basketball player
Marvin Rees (born 1972), British politician
Marvin Rettenmaier (born 1986), German poker player
Marvin Rick (1901–1999), American runner
Marvin Rittmüller (born 1999), German footballer
Marvin Robinson (born 1980), English footballer
Marvin Ross (born 1990), American football player
Marvin Travis Runyon (1924–2004), American business executive

S
Marvin R. Sambur (born 1946), American engineer
Marvin Sanders (born 1967), American football coach
Marvin Sands (1924–1999), American businessman
Marvin Santiago (1947–2004), Puerto Rican singer
Marvin Sapp (born 1967), American singer-songwriter
Marvin Schick (1934–2020), American professor
Marvin Schieb (born 1996), Romanian footballer
Marvin Schlegel (born 1998), German athlete
Marvin C. Schumann (1906–1994), American businessman and politician
Marvin Schwarz (1928–1997), American producer
Marvin Scott (born 1944), American politician
Marvin Sease (1946–2011), American singer-songwriter
Marvin Emil Seidel (born 1995), German badminton player
Marvin Senaya (born 2001), French footballer
Marvin Senger (born 2000), German footballer
Marvin Sewell, American guitarist
Marvin Shanken (born 1943), American publisher
Marvin Glenn Shields (1939–1965), American sailor
Marvin Simon (1939–2007), American engineer
Marvin Sims (born 1957), American football player
Marvin Singleton (born 1939), American politician
Marvin Smith (disambiguation), multiple people
Marvin Sonsona (born 1990), Filipino boxer
Marvin Sordell (born 1991), English footballer
Marvin Spielmann (born 1996), Swiss footballer
Marvin Stamm (born 1939), American trumpeter
Marvin Stein (1925–2010), American comic book artist
Marvin Stein (computer scientist) (1924–2015), American computer scientist
Marvin Stewart (1912–2009), American football player
Marvin Stewart (basketball), American basketball player
Marvin Stinson (born 1952), American boxer
Marvin Stone (1842–1899), American inventor
Marvin Stone (basketball) (1981–2008), American basketball player
Marvin Stout (1915–1991), American basketball player
Marvin A. Sweeney (born 1953), American professor
Marvin Switzer (born 1954), American football player

T
Marvin Tate (born 1959), American singer-songwriter
Marvin Terban (born 1940), American author
Marvin Terrell (1938–2018), American football player
Marvin Terrell (baseball), American baseball player
Marvin Thiel (born 1995), German footballer
Marvin Thiele (born 1998), German footballer
Marvin Thompson (born 1977/1978), British writer
Marvin Tile (born 1933), Canadian surgeon
Marvin Tokayer (born 1936), American rabbi
Marvin Townes (born 1980), American football player
Marvin Townsend (1915–1999), American cartoonist
Marvin Traub (1925–2012), American businessman
Marvin Tshibuabua (born 2002), French footballer
Marvin Turpin (1885–??), Guyanese cricketer

U
Marvin J. Udy (1892–1959), American scientist
Marvin Upshaw (born 1946), American football player

V
Marvin Valdimarsson (born 1981), Icelandic basketball player
Marvin Van Buren (born 1989), American film director
Marvin Vettori (born 1993), Italian mixed martial artist
Marvin Vincent (1834–1922), American minister
Marvin Vogel (born 1985), Zimbabwean cricketer

W
Marvin L. Warner (1919–2002), American ambassador
Marvin Washington (born 1965), American football player
Marvin Weatherwax Jr., American politician
Marvin Webster (1952–2009), American basketball player
Marvin Weiss (born 1995), German footballer
Marvin Westmore (1934–2020), American artist
Marvin White (born 1983), American football player
Marvin Williams (disambiguation), multiple people
Marvin Wilson (disambiguation), multiple people
Marvin Winans (born 1958), American singer
Marvin Wolfgang (1924–1998), American sociologist
Marvin Worth (1925–1998), American producer

X
Marvin X (born 1944), American poet

Y
Marvin Yancy (1950–1985), American musician
Marvin York (born 1932), American politician
Marvin R. Young (1947–1968), American soldier

Z
Marvin Zelen (1927–2014), American professor
Marvin Zelkowitz (born 1945), American computer scientist
Marvin Zindler (1921–2007), American news reporter
Marvin Zuckerman (1928–2018), American professor
Marvin Zwickl (born 2004), Austrian footballer

Fictional characters
 Marvin (horror host), 1950s Chicago area horror host
 Marvin the Martian, in the Looney Tunes cartoons
 Marvin, the Paranoid Android, in The Hitchhiker's Guide to the Galaxy series
 Marvin Redpost, the main character in the Marvin Redpost series by Louis Sachar
 Marvin Monroe, a The Simpsons character who apparently died during the sixth season
 Marvin Suggs, from The Muppet Show
 Marvin T. Milk, a character from the The Boys television series known as "Mother's Milk" and "MM"
 Mouth McFadden, real name Marvin, a main character in One Tree Hill (TV series)
 Marvin Branagh, a Lieutenant at the Raccoon Police Department in Resident Evil 2

See also
Marvin (disambiguation)

References 

English masculine given names

pl:Marvin